Hanskhali Assembly constituency was an assembly constituency in Nadia district in the Indian state of West Bengal. It was reserved for scheduled castes.

Overview
As a consequence of the order of the Delimitation Commission Hanskhali Assembly constituency ceases to exist from 2011. Ranaghat Uttar Purba Assembly constituency is a new constituency in the area.

Hanskhali assembly constituency was part of the Nabadwip (Lok Sabha constituency).

Members of Legislative Assembly

Election results

1977-2006
Nayan Sarkar of CPI (M) won the 79 Hanskhali (SC) assembly seat in 2006 and 2001 defeating his nearest rivals Dr. Ramendra Nath Biswas and Abir Ranjan Biswas (both of Trinamool Congress) in the respective years. In 1996, Sasanka Sekhar Biswas of Congress defeated Nayan Sarkar of CPI (M). In 1991, Nayan Sarkar of CPI(M) defeated Sasanka Sekhar Biswas of Congress. In 1987, 1982 and 1977, Sukumar Mandal of CPI (M) defeated Sasanka Sekhar Biswas, Kshownish Biswas and Ananda Mohan Biswas (all of Congress) in respective years.

1962-1972
Ananda Mohan Biswas of Congress won in 1972 and 1971. Charu Mihir Sarkar of Bangla Congress won in 1969 and 1967. Pramatha Ranjan Thakur of Congress won in 1962. Prior to that the Hanskhali seat was not there.

References

Former assembly constituencies of West Bengal
Politics of Nadia district